The Patriarch of Bulgaria and Metropolitan of Sofia undertakes visits of behalf of the Bulgarian Orthodox Church.

Patriarch Cyril I (1953-1971)

  - 16 - 22 March 1962
  - 1962
  - 1962
  - 1962
  - 1962
  - 16 - 20 April 1962
  - 24 - 28 May 1963

Patriarch Maxim I (1971-2012)

  - May - June 1975
  - 1 September - 12 October 1978
  - 10 - 16 October 1995
  - 17 - 22 August 2000

Patriarch Neophyte I (2013-)

  - 23 - 26 July 2013
  - 26 - 30 July 2013
  - 20 - 23 September 2013
  - 5 - 9 March 2014
  - 23 - 30 May 2014
  - 7 - 11 March 2016
  - 10 - 11 May 2016
  - 7 January 2018
 Istanbul - reopening of St. Stephen Church with the  Ecumenical Patriarch of Constantinople in the presence of the President of Turkey and the Prime Ministers of Bulgaria and Turkey.
  - 9 - 11 November 2019
 Vienna - 50th Anniversary of the registration and state recognition of the Bulgarian Orthodox Church community “Saint John of Rila” by the Republic of Austria.

External links 

 The official website of the Bulgarian Patriarchate

Patriarchs of Bulgaria